Fantasy Hero Companion is a supplement published by Hero Games / Iron Crown Enterprises (I.C.E.) in 1990 for the fantasy role-playing game Fantasy Hero.

Contents
Fantasy Hero Companion is a supplement for Fantasy Hero with rules for mass combat, 12 sample locations, more monsters, more magic items, and colleges of spells.

Publication history
In 1981, Hero Games published the superhero role-playing game (RPG) Champions that used a new form of rules. In 1985, using the same "Hero System" of rules, they produced Fantasy Hero, a fantasy role-playing game. Hero Games then ran into financial difficulty, and was eventually taken over as a subsidiary of I.C.E. In 1990, Hero Games/I.C.E. published a Fantasy Hero Companion, a supplement to Fantasy Hero that used the latest update of the Hero System rules set. The 144-page softcover book was edited by Rob Bell, with a cover by Larry Elmore.

Shannon Appelcline noted that when Iron Crown Enterprises began publishing Hero System genre books, that "ICE never supported these individual genres — as Hero had rarely supported anything but Champions — with the only exceptions being Fantasy Hero Companion (1990) and Fantasy Hero Companion II (1992). However, they did begin publishing sourcebooks for the Hero System as a whole, which could be used with all genres."

Reviews
White Wolf #25 (Feb./March, 1991)
Papyrus Issue 6 (1992, p. 6)
Adventurers Club Issue 16 (Summer 1990, p. 4)

References

Hero System
Role-playing game supplements introduced in 1990